An autograph is a person's own handwriting or signature.
 a manuscript written by the author of its content. In this meaning the term autograph can often be used interchangeably with holograph.
 a celebrity's handwritten signature. Autograph collecting is the activity of collecting such autographs.

History

What might be considered the oldest "autograph" is a Sumerian clay table from about 3100 BC which includes the name of the scribe Gar.Ama. No ancient written autographs have been found, and the earliest one known for a major historical figure is that of El Cid from 1098.

Autograph manuscript

"Autograph" can refer to a document transcribed entirely in the handwriting of its author, as opposed to a typeset document or one written by an amanuensis or a copyist. This meaning overlaps that of "holograph".

Celebrity's signature

Autograph collecting is the hobby of collecting autographs of famous persons. Some of the most popular categories of autograph subjects are presidents, military soldiers, athletes, movie stars, artists, social and religious leaders, scientists, astronauts, and authors.

See also
 Asemic writing
 Profiles in History
 Memorial to the 56 Signers of the Declaration of Independence, stone blocks with depicted signatures
 Autograph show

References

Further reading
 Collecting Autographs and Manuscripts by Charles Hamilton, Univ. of Oklahoma Press, 1961, 269 pages.
 Autographs and Manuscripts: A Collector's Manual edited by Ed Berkeley, Charles Scribner's Sons Pub., 1978, 565 pages.
T.J. Brown's series on Autographs in The Book Collector.

External links

  (early 20th-century periodical, full view)

Manuscripts
Signature